The 2018–19 James Madison Dukes women's basketball team represents James Madison University during the 2018–19 NCAA Division I women's basketball season. The Dukes, led by third year head coach Sean O'Regan, play their home games at the James Madison University Convocation Center and are members of the Colonial Athletic Association (CAA). They finished the season 29–6, 16–1 in CAA play to win the CAA regular season title. They lost in the quarterfinals of the CAA women's tournament to Hofstra. They received an automatic bid to the Women's National Invitation Tournament where they defeated North Carolina A&T, South Florida, Virginia Tech in the first, second and third rounds, Georgetown in the quarterfinals before losing to Northwestern in the semifinals.

Roster

Schedule

|-
!colspan=9 style=| Exhibition

|-
!colspan=9 style=| Non-conference regular season

|-
!colspan=9 style=| CAA regular season

|-
!colspan=9 style=| CAA Women's Tournament

|-
!colspan=12 style=| WNIT

Rankings
2018–19 NCAA Division I women's basketball rankings

See also
2018–19 James Madison Dukes men's basketball team

References

James Madison Dukes women's basketball seasons
James Madison
James Madison